Shawinigan High School is an English-language combined elementary and secondary school in Shawinigan, Quebec, Canada. The school is operated by the Central Quebec School Board. Parents can participate on the school's governing board and in its Home and School Association.

References

External links

High schools in Quebec
English-language schools in Quebec
Schools in Shawinigan